Porkey is an unincorporated community in Howe Township, Forest County, Pennsylvania, United States.

The settlement is located within the Allegheny National Forest along Pennsylvania Route 666, next to Tionesta Creek.

History
The early settlement contained three lumber mills and was described as "a small but active little town".

Porkey was a stop on the Sheffield and Tionesta Railway, a now-abandoned -long railway that began operating in 1900.

A wagon bridge was built across Tionesta Creek at Porkey in 1918.

References

Unincorporated communities in Forest County, Pennsylvania
Unincorporated communities in Pennsylvania